The American Society of Appraisers (ASA) is an American nonprofit organization which serves as a professional affiliation of appraisers of all disciplines. The organization is the largest multi-discipline, voluntary membership, trade association representing and promoting their member appraisers.

History 
The organization was formally formed in 1952, after consolidation of two prior appraisal organizations, The American Society of Technical Appraisers (ASTA), and the Technical Valuation Society (TVS). 

In 2017, the Society merged with National Association of Independent Fee Appraisers (NAIFA), bringing total membership to over 5,500 members in 75 countries.

The ASA is also one of the eight trade association appraisal groups that founded The Appraisal Foundation.

Activities 
The Society comprises appraisal review and management, business valuation, gems and jewelry, machinery and technical specialties, personal property and real property. Candidates—who must have a low level four-year university degree or its equivalent—are eligible for the Accredited Senior Appraiser (ASA) designation after completing the following: five years of documented appraisal experience; testing in their field or specialty; the submission of two appraisal reports to the society's International Board of Examiners for review; successful completion of the Principles of Valuation education program; and successful completion of the 15-hour Uniform Standards of Professional Appraisal Practice (USPAP) course with examination. A lesser level of designation—Accredited Member or AM—requires only two years of documented appraisal experience in addition to all of the other requirements.  Both of these designations are entry level.  They do not rise to the equivalent of a Masters or Phd. in finance, business or economics, though they do provide an educational floor of knowledge in these subjects.

Unlike a Masters education in finance from an accredited university, which requires a once in a lifetime payment, trade associations like the American Society of Appraisers require annual membership dues.  In addition, in order to sustain its business model and cash flows, Voluntary Member Appraisers in the Society subject themselves to arbitrary mandatory re-accreditation process every five years.  To re-certify they must provide proof of professional growth through continuing education, participation in society activities, and the completion of updated USPAP courses.  Publishing articles in professional journals and valuation or specialty-related speaking engagements also provide Society's appraisers with re-certification credit.  In addition, the organization will from time to time fractionalize, create and sell new credentials, which are a repeat and repackaging of old courses and concepts for these credentials under a new name.

See also
 CBV Institute
 American Institute of Certified Public Accountants (AICPA)
 International Valuation Standards Council (IVSC)

References

External links
 Official site

Professional associations based in the United States
Valuation professionals
Professional valuation organizations